The 1999 The 50th Pepsi Southern 500, the 50th running of the event, was a NASCAR Winston Cup Series race held on September 5, 1999, at Darlington Raceway in Darlington County, South Carolina. Contested at 270 laps  – shortened from 367 laps due to rain – on the 1.366 mile (2.198 km) speedway, it was the 24th race of the 1999 NASCAR Winston Cup Series season. Jeff Burton of Roush Racing won the race, and the No Bull 5 Million Dollar Bonus as well.

Kenny Irwin Jr. would earn his final pole position while qualifying for this event.

Top ten results

Race statistics
 Time of race: 3:25:15
 Average Speed: 
 Pole Speed: 170.97
 Cautions: 6 for 62 laps
 Margin of Victory: under caution
 Lead changes: 20
 Percent of race run under caution: 23%         
 Average green flag run: 34.7 laps

References

The 50th Pepsi Southern 500
The 50th Pepsi Southern 500
Pepsi Southern 500
NASCAR races at Darlington Raceway